Eidsvig is a surname. Notable people with the surname include:

 Bernt Ivar Eidsvig (born 1953), Norwegian Catholic Bishop of Oslo 
 Harold Eidsvig (1915–1959), Canadian professional golfer